Neale (full name and dates of birth and death unknown) was an English cricketer. Neale's batting style is unknown.

Neale made a single first-class appearance for England against Hampshire in 1842 at Day's Ground, Southampton. In a match which England won by an innings and 5 runs, Neale batted once, scoring 15 unbeaten runs in England's first-innings, with his score the highest individual score during the innings.

References

External links
Neale at ESPNcricinfo
Neale at CricketArchive

English cricketers
Non-international England cricketers